Megachile dentitarsus is a species of bee in the family Megachilidae. It was described by F. W. L. Sladen in 1919.

References

Dentitarsus
Insects described in 1919